Raudfjordbreen is a glacier at Spitsbergen, Svalbard, on the divide between Albert I Land and Haakon VII Land. It has a length of 18 kilometers and debouches into Klinckowströmfjorden, the eastern branch of Raudfjorden.

References

Glaciers of Spitsbergen